Old Kilpatrick railway station was located in the village of Old Kilpatrick, Scotland on the Lanarkshire and Dunbartonshire Railway.

The station opened in 1896 and was closed in 1964 (along with much of the L&DR route) as part of the route rationalisation plan associated with the North Clyde electrification scheme.

See also
Kilpatrick railway station

References

Sources

External links
Video footage of the old station

Disused railway stations in West Dunbartonshire
Beeching closures in Scotland
Railway stations in Great Britain opened in 1896
Railway stations in Great Britain closed in 1964
Former Caledonian Railway stations